"Mae" is a 1965 song written by Riz Ortolani for the MGM motion picture The Yellow Rolls-Royce; the song is the theme for the section of the film in which ownership of the titular Rolls-Royce passes to a gangster and becomes the backdrop to a dangerous romance between the gangster's girlfriend Mae Jenkins (Shirley MacLaine) and a young Italian named Stefano (Alain Delon).

The song with English lyrics, "She's Just a Quiet Girl", was recorded and released as a single by Ella Fitzgerald. Julie London included the song on her album Feeling Good (1965).

The tune was covered as an instrumental by Herb Alpert on Going Places, and released as a single both by Alpert and by Pete Fountain, also in 1965.

References

1965 songs
Songs with music by Riz Ortolani
Ella Fitzgerald songs
Herb Alpert songs
MGM Records singles